Zakharovo is a rural locality (a village) in Gorodetskoye Rural Settlement, Kichmengsko-Gorodetsky District, Vologda Oblast, Russia. The population was 28 as of 2002.

Geography 
Zakharovo is located 19 km northwest of Kichmengsky Gorodok (the district's administrative centre) by road. Glebovo is the nearest rural locality.

References 

Rural localities in Kichmengsko-Gorodetsky District